Norman Police Department is the primary law enforcement agency in Norman, Oklahoma. Consisting of over 180 officers and 60 support staff, the department is the third largest in Oklahoma, and serves a population of over 100,000 people. The department is headed by Kevin Foster, a member of the department since 1989.

History

The Norman Police Department was established in 1919. Prior to this the law enforcement duties for the community were provided by Deputy U.S. Marshals, then a city marshal.

In 1924, the Norman Police employed four officers. By 1936, the staff had increased to eight officers. These officers worked twelve-hour shifts, seven days a week.  By the mid 1930s, the department had one car which was operated twenty-four hours a day. There were also three officers who walked a foot beat in the downtown area on a twenty-four-hour-a-day basis. In 1938, four more officers were hired, with the shifts going to eight-hour shifts, six days a week.

In 1995 the Norman Police Department adopted Community Oriented Policing as the approach to solving problems in the community. Norman was divided into thirteen police beats with officers being assigned to the beats on a permanent basis. The Community Oriented Policing philosophy centers around building partnerships between the police and members of the community. Working together, solutions to problems are discovered and cooperation leads to resolutions.

Specialties

Some of the specialized assignments in the Norman Police Department are:
 Bicycle Team
 Bomb Squad
 Crime Scene Technician
 Criminal Investigations
 Crisis Negotiation
 Emergency Response Team (SWAT)
 Field Training Officer
 Honor Guard
 Physical Fitness Instructor
 Pistol Team
 Special Operations (Narcotics)
 Traffic Enforcement
 K-9

See also

List of law enforcement agencies in Oklahoma

References

External links
 Norman Police website

Norman, Oklahoma
Municipal police departments of Oklahoma
1919 establishments in Oklahoma